Pietro Trivulzio (died 1523) was a Roman Catholic prelate who served as Archbishop of Reggio Calabria (1520–1523).

Biography
On 1 October 1520, Pietro Trivulzio was appointed during the papacy of Pope Leo X as Archbishop of Reggio Calabria.
He served as Archbishop of Reggio Calabria until his death in 1523.).

References

External links and additional sources
 (for Chronology of Bishops) 
 (for Chronology of Bishops) 

16th-century Roman Catholic archbishops in the Kingdom of Naples
Bishops appointed by Pope Leo X
1523 deaths